Bo Gunnar Hansson, publicly known as Bosse Hansson (born 20 December 1933) is a Swedish television journalist and sports broadcaster.

Career
Hansson was born in Jönköping, Sweden, the son of Gerald Hansson, an office manager, and his wife Dagny (née Ahnberg). He passed studentexamen in 1953 and studied at the University of Gothenburg between 1954 and 1957. Hansson worked at Idrottsbladet from 1957 to 1962, at Strömbergs förlag from 1962 to 1965 and at Radiosporten, the sport section of Sveriges Radio from 1965 to 1969, before switching to Sveriges Television (SVT) in 1969.

As a journalist he has covered several international sporting events such as the FIFA World Cup and the Olympics. He was the live commentary when Thomas Ravelli saved the decisive penalty in the 1994 World Cup quarter final penalty shootout between Sweden and Romania; a moment that was later dubbed the biggest Swedish sports moment of the 20th century.

Racialist controversy arose in 2012 when he sat in the commentator booth at Råsunda Stadium and was heard saying 'not another black player' in a derogatory manner to an AIK substitution.

2019 arrest
In early 2019 he was arrested in Florida, United States, for allegedly having performed lewd and lascivious acts against two minor boys. Hansson later pleaded guilty.

Bibliography

References

1933 births
Living people
People from Jönköping
Swedish sports broadcasters
Swedish television journalists
University of Gothenburg alumni
Swedish people imprisoned abroad